Ranzhir (GRAU designation 9S737) is a Soviet/Russian mobile command center for several types of Russian anti-aircraft weapons, such as Tor, Tunguska, Strela-10, Igla and Osa.

It is used for a mixed grouping of air defense forces.

Development 
9S737 vehicle was designed by Belarusian scientific and research institute of automatization technologies (NIISA), currently "AGAT–Control Systems". A. V. Shershnev was appointed chief designer of 9S737 vehicle.

State trials of the system were held from August 1987 till June 1988 at Embi testing range (nowadays at Kazakhstan). In 1989 it was approved for military.

Mass production was started at Minsk NPO Agat, but later transferred to Radiozavod (Penza)

Modifications 
 9S737М Ranzhir-M

See also 
 PPRU-1

References

External links 
  Ranzhir-M at pvo.guns.ru (Vestnik PVO) website

Self-propelled anti-aircraft weapons
Self-propelled anti-aircraft weapons of the Soviet Union
Self-propelled anti-aircraft weapons of Russia
Military electronics of Russia
Military vehicles introduced in the 1980s